Kveikur (pronounced , fuse or candlewick) is the seventh studio album from Icelandic post-rock band Sigur Rós. It was released 12 June 2013 in Japan, on 17 June internationally, and on 18 June in the United States through XL Recordings. It is the first album to be fully released through XL after the band departed EMI and Parlophone during the label's acquisition by Universal Music Group in 2012. It is the only album since their debut, Von, not to feature Kjartan Sveinsson, following his departure in 2012 (instead featured as the album's co-producer), and the last to feature drummer Orri Páll Dýrason before his departure in 2018. The cover is a photo by the Brazilian artist Lygia Clark.

Composition
Kveikur sees a new direction taken by Sigur Rós, both musically and thematically. The band has described the album's sound as "more aggressive" than any of their previous works. All tracks are sung in Icelandic, although Yfirborð contains some reversed words at the start, which can be considered Hopelandic.

Promotion
Kveikur was officially unveiled by the band and label XL Recordings on 22 March 2013. The album's details, such as artwork, tracklist, and release date, were publicly announced, along with dates for the band's corresponding tour. An EP, entitled Brennisteinn and featuring lead single "Brennisteinn" and two Kveikur cuts "Hryggjarsula" and "Ofbirta", was also released on the same day to ticket holders of North American dates on the Sigur Rós World Tour. On the 11th of June the album was made available to stream live in its entirety online.

Singles
"Brennisteinn" was released as the lead single from Kveikur on 25 March 2013. The eight-minute music video for the song, directed by Andrew Huang, was released three days earlier during Kveikur'''s unveiling on March 22.

"Ísjaki" was released as a radio-only single from the album a month later on 24 April 2013. The song was also released early for download on iTunes through Kveikur's listing, before the album was released in June. The band also released an accompanying lyric video for the song on their YouTube channel on 2 April. The video is also notably the band's first lyric video for a song since the band's formation in 1994.

Tour
The band embarked on the Sigur Rós World Tour in late 2012 and throughout 2013 in promotion of Kveikur. The 82-date tour visited Australia, South-East and East Asia, Europe and North America. The North American leg of the tour, which occurred in March and April, was supported by Oneohtrix Point Never and Tim Hecker. During the former legs of the tour, Kveikur tracks "Kveikur", "Yfirborð", "Hrafntinna", and "Brennisteinn" had been played live. The band performed "Kveikur" on NBC late night talk show Late Night with Jimmy Fallon during the tour on 22 March 2013.

Reception

Critical receptionKveikur, much like most of Sigur Rós' releases, was met with generally positive reviews upon release. At Metacritic, which assigns a normalized rating out of 100 to reviews from mainstream critics, the album received an average score of 80, which indicates "generally favorable reviews", based on 36 reviews.

Gregory Haney of AllMusic complimented the band's efforts, writing that "Post-rock can be an awfully passive listening experience, sweeping the listeners up in drifting buildup and inevitable crescendos without ever really confronting them. Challenging this paradigm, Sigur Rós get sonically adventurous with their seventh album, Kveikur, which finds the Icelandic three-piece delivering a darker and more aggressive sound on one of their most daring albums to date." Gareth James of Clash praised the diversity of the music on Kveikur: "No two songs sound similar and, while Jónsi's vocals confirm that this is, really, the artist on the album sleeve, it is far from more of the same."

Christian Cottingham of Drowned in Sound in his positive review of the album praised both the originality and lack of commercialism in Kveikur. He stated, "With Kveikur, Sigur Rós seem to be shrinking from the light, away from the TV adverts and the Top Gear soundtracks, the Shia LaBeouf videos and the Daily Mail articles and the Hollywood movies. And that's a good thing: for an alternative group from Iceland that veer between their native tongue and a made-up language they were becoming all too ubiquitous, and far less interesting with it - heck, when your own webstore starts selling candles 'specially developed to the band's olfactory specifications' it's definitely time for something new. For too long - arguably since 2005's Takk... - Sigur Rós have been making music to cry to, to make love to, to meditate or pray or wind down to, music for lonely walks or misty hikes, for sunrise and sunset and solstice, for children to sleep to and people to wake up to (disclosure: "Hoppípolla" is my alarm tone…) - music to sift into the background, unobtrusive, a wallpaper for the postcard Iceland, beautiful but safe. Well, here's the flipside, that long Scandinavian winter of frostbite and storms, of frozen rock and suicides, the Northern Lights cast overhead not dancing but shivering, particles undulating sinisterly against blackened skies and all the better for it."

Complementary to Cottingham's review, NME also praised the lack of commercialism and noted the album's shock factor: "This is an album no-one anticipated Sigur Rós would make. This is a band whose frontman now scores Hollywood films (Cameron Crowe's We Bought A Zoo), whose household name status was confirmed when they recently cameoed on The Simpsons, who in recent years have dealt more in bright, bouncy orchestral indie (2008's Arcade Fire-ish Með suð í eyrum við spilum endalaust) than the dark experimental fare they made their name with. So Kveikur comes as a violent but welcome surprise."

She wrote, "While energized, Kveikur doesn't break away from Sigur Rós' safe spots. Those who have followed the band down the same trails for years will happily be able to do so again. But those who are still hungry for the thickets of Ágætis byrjun or the haunted tundra of Von won't find many new landmarks here. This is a dark, warm, safe space for Sigur Rós and their devotees. Don't expect to lose your way."

Commercial performanceKveikur debuted at number 14 on the US Billboard 200 with sales of 22,831 copies.

Track listing

Personnel
Adapted from Kveikur'' liner notes.

Sigur Rós
Jón Þór Birgisson – vocals, guitar
Georg Hólm – bass
Orri Páll Dýrason – drums

Additional musicians
Eiríkur Orri Ólafsson - brass arrangement
Daníel Bjarnason - string arrangement
Sigrún Jónsdóttir - brass
Eiríkur Orri Ólafsson - brass
Bergrún Snæbjörnsdóttir - brass
Borgar Magnason - strings
Margrét Árnadóttir - strings
Pálína Árnadóttir - strings
Una Sveinbjarnardóttir - strings
Þórunn Ósk Marinósdóttir - strings

Additional personnel
Ted Jensen - mastering
Rich Costey - mixing
Alex Somers - mixing, recording
Elisabeth Carlsson - assistant mixing
Eric Isip - assistant mixing
Chris Kasych - assistant mixing 
Laura Sisk - assistant mixing
Birgir Jón Birgisson - recording
Kjartan Sveinsson - assistant producing, mixing
Alex Somers - assistant producing
Valgeir Sigurdsson - recording (strings)

Charts

Weekly charts

Year-end charts

Release history

References

2013 albums
Sigur Rós albums
XL Recordings albums